Phobia is the third studio album by American rock band Breaking Benjamin. It was recorded at The Barbershop Studios in Hopatcong, New Jersey, and released on August 8, 2006, through Hollywood Records.

Overview
Phobia was released on August 8, 2006, and quickly sold out at major retail chains such as Best Buy and Target. The album sold 131,000 copies in its first week, which made it the fastest selling and highest charting Breaking Benjamin album (until 2015's Dark Before Dawn), hitting number two on the US Billboard 200. This is the first studio album Chad Szeliga recorded with the band. The intro track features the sound effects of an airport, namely a flight attendant announcing standard safety procedures and the sound of an airplane making its ascent, alluding to Benjamin Burnley's fear of flying, hence the inspiration for the album name, Phobia.

The album re-entered the US Billboard 200 at number 38 on May 5, 2007, with its reissue. On May 21, 2009, the album was certified platinum by the RIAA and on October 15, 2021, the album was certified silver by the BPI, making it their most successful album in terms of sales internationally.

Reception

Phobia received generally mixed reviews. Corey Apar of AllMusic called the album "nothing if not consistent" with their past material, concluding "Phobia will not win over any skeptics still holding out on the band, but for those already happily settled in the Benjamin camp, it makes for another satisfying listen." Simon K. of Sputnik Music was more critical, stating "There are a couple of songs on here that are easily forgettable and lack any real substance from the vocal side of things, and because the music behind it is keeping vocals in mind, the song suffers because of it," though also felt that "[...] it’s still a very enjoyable album." Entertainment Weekly criticized the disc's dark tone, saying almost every song was "[...] a cry  in the darkness of a cruel world," but praised it's "[...]expansive choruses and epic riffs".

Track listing

1The CD released with the Phobia Collectors Edition DVD also includes this track.

2This track is not listed on the album's back insert. When played, it appears as track 14, making "So Cold" track 15 and "Rain" track 16.

Track listing

This DVD was released in April 2007 as part of the Phobia Collectors Edition CD and DVD package; it features the band's entire February 11, 2007 concert at Stabler Arena in Bethlehem, Pennsylvania.

Song information
"The Diary of Jane" is a hidden track (number 124) on the Hollywood Rip Ride Rockit roller coaster at Universal Studios Florida.
"The Diary of Jane" was the fastest added song ever in Hollywood Records' history, and was featured in the video game NASCAR 07.
"You" was played live for the first time during an all acoustic set at Concert for a Cause IV in April 2006, while the band was still in the recording process. In an interview, Burnley revealed that he had mistakenly forgotten the second verse of the song during the set.
"Topless" was written and performed before the band had even released their debut album Saturate, in 1998 when the band first formed and was originally called "Top of the World".
 "The Diary of Jane", and "Breath" were covered by the classical cover quartet tribute band Vitamin String Quartet, and the covers of those songs appear on the albums Strung Out – the String Quartet Tribute and Hard Rock Hits, Vol. 4.
 According to lead singer Benjamin Burnley on the Phobia DVD, the track "Evil Angel" was one of the first songs he wrote for Phobia.
 The single "Until the End" is featured on Guitar Hero 5 as well as their other hit singles, "Sooner or Later" from We Are Not Alone and "Give Me a Sign" from Dear Agony as downloadable content in the game.

Personnel
Credits adapted from album's liner notes.

Breaking Benjamin
 Benjamin Burnley – lead and backing vocals, rhythm guitar, piano 
 Aaron Fink – lead guitar
 Mark Klepaski – bass guitar
 Chad Szeliga – drums, percussion

Additional musicians
 Sebastian Davin (of Dropping Daylight) – piano  and backing vocals 
 David Eggar – cello 
 Scott Treibitz – cello arrangement 

Management
 Jason Jordan – A&R
 Larry Mazer and Tamra Feldman – management for Entertainment Services
 Nick Ferrara – legal for Serling Rooks
 Andy Somers – booking agent for The Agency Group
 Lic Wheeler – marketing

Production
 David Bendeth – producer, digital editing, mixing 
 Arranged by Benjamin Burnley and David Bendeth
 Dan Korneff, John Bender – engineering, digital editing
 Kato Khandwala – digital editing
 Mark Rinaldi and Austin Briggs – assistant engineers
 Ben Grosse – mixing 
 Paul Pavao – assistant mixing 
 Chris Lord-Alge – mixing 
 Keith Armstrong and Dim-E – assistant mixing 
 Ted Jensen – mastering

Artwork
 T42design – art direction and design
 Kamil Vojnar – cover artwork at Getty Images
 Phil Mucci, Prem Prakash Sahu, Dada Jayela – photography

Chart positions

Weekly charts

Singles

Year-end charts

Certifications

Release history

References

2006 albums
Albums produced by David Bendeth
Breaking Benjamin albums
Hollywood Records albums